Tatyana Efimenko (born 2 January 1981 in Frunze, Kyrgyz SSR) is a female high jumper from Kyrgyzstan. Her personal best jump is 1.97 metres, achieved in July 2003 in Rome.

She won the bronze medal at the 1998 World Junior Championships and finished fifth at the 2002 IAAF World Cup. She competed at the World Championships in 1999 and 2005 without reaching the finals there. At the Olympic Games she exited in the qualifying round in 2000 and 2004, failing to clear the opening height in the former. On the regional level she won the Asian Championships in 2002 and 2005 as well as the 2002 Asian Games. She took the silver medal at the 2006 Asian Games.

Achievements

References

External links
 

1981 births
Living people
Kyrgyzstani female high jumpers
Athletes (track and field) at the 2000 Summer Olympics
Athletes (track and field) at the 2004 Summer Olympics
Athletes (track and field) at the 2008 Summer Olympics
Olympic athletes of Kyrgyzstan
Asian Games medalists in athletics (track and field)
Athletes (track and field) at the 1998 Asian Games
Athletes (track and field) at the 2002 Asian Games
Athletes (track and field) at the 2006 Asian Games
Athletes (track and field) at the 2010 Asian Games
Sportspeople from Bishkek
Kyrgyzstani people of Ukrainian descent
World Athletics Championships athletes for Kyrgyzstan
Asian Games gold medalists for Kyrgyzstan
Asian Games silver medalists for Kyrgyzstan
Medalists at the 2002 Asian Games
Medalists at the 2006 Asian Games
21st-century Kyrgyzstani women